is a junior college in Kōtō, Tokyo, Japan.

It was founded in 2009. The predecessor of the school, Nihon Ongaku Gakko, was founded in 1903.

External links
 

Universities and colleges in Tokyo
Educational institutions established in 2009
Japanese junior colleges
Private universities and colleges in Japan
Buildings and structures in Koto, Tokyo
2009 establishments in Japan